The 2004–05 Football League Two season was the first season since the Football League Third Division was renamed League Two, following a sponsorship deal with Coca-Cola. The league was made up of eighteen teams from the Third Division who were neither promoted nor relegated, the four relegated teams from the Second Division, and the two promoted from the Football Conference (all from the 2003–04 season).

Promotion and relegation

Relegated from Second Division
Grimsby Town
Rushden & Diamonds
Notts County
Wycombe Wanderers

Promoted from Football Conference
Chester City
Shrewsbury Town

League table

Play-offs

Top scorers

Source

References

External links
 League Table

 
4
EFL League Two seasons
3
Eng